Batic, with various diacritics, is an South Slavic surname. Notable people with the surname include:
Olgica Batić (born 1981), Serbian lawyer and politician
Polly Batic (1906-1992), Austrian operatic mezzo-soprano
Stojan Batič (1925-2015), Slovene sculptor
Štefka Batič from the painting Lacemaker (Portrait of Štefka Batič)
Vladan Batić (1949-2010), Serbian lawyer and politician

See also

Batik (disambiguation)

South Slavic-language surnames